The Super Start Batteries 188 was a NASCAR Xfinity Series race on the Daytona International Speedway infield road course in Daytona Beach, Florida. Originally created in 2020 as a temporary event in response to races canceled by the COVID-19 pandemic, the race returned in 2021 for the same reason.

Ty Gibbs is the defending race winner. The race, along with the NASCAR Camping World Truck Series' BrakeBest Select 159, supports the NASCAR Cup Series' O'Reilly Auto Parts 253.

History

The Daytona road course, which uses elements of the  speedway oval, is commonly used for the 24 Hours of Daytona sports car race and Daytona 200 motorcycle race. In March 2020, NASCAR announced the NASCAR Cup Series' Busch Clash exhibition race would use the road course instead of the oval beginning in 2021.

In July 2020, the COVID-19 pandemic forced the Zippo 200 at The Glen road course race at Watkins Glen International, which was planned for August, to be replaced by the temporary Daytona road course event due to New York's quarantine rules for out-of-state visitors. While much of the road course layout remained the same as the sports car configuration, NASCAR added a chicane exiting the oval's turn four to allow cars to slow down entering the braking-heavy turn one. Austin Cindric, driving for Team Penske, won the event's lightning-plagued inaugural running in 2020; it was Cindric's fifth win in six races.

Although intended to be a temporary race, the UNOH 188 returned to the Xfinity Series schedule in 2021 after the originally-scheduled race weekend at Auto Club Speedway was canceled due to concerns related to COVID-19. O'Reilly Auto Parts took over naming rights for the race weekend, naming the Xfinity event the Super Start Batteries 188. Ty Gibbs won in his Xfinity Series debut, becoming the sixth driver in series history to do so and the series' youngest road course winner at 18 years, four months, and 16 days.

Past winners

Notes
2021: Race extended due to a NASCAR Overtime finish.

Manufacturer wins

See also
BrakeBest Select 159

References

External links
 

2020 establishments in Florida
NASCAR Xfinity Series races
 
Recurring sporting events established in 2020
Annual sporting events in the United States